"You're All That Matters to Me" is a song by American singer-songwriter Curtis Stigers. It was the second single released from his debut studio album, Curtis Stigers (1991), and peaked at number six on the UK Singles Chart in 1992. Although a commercial disappointment in the United States, the song reached the top 40 in Belgium, Ireland, and Canada, reaching number two on the Canadian RPM Adult Contemporary chart for three weeks.

Charts

Weekly charts

Year-end charts

Release history

References

1991 songs
1992 singles
Arista Records singles
Curtis Stigers songs
Song recordings produced by Glen Ballard
Songs written by Gregg Sutton
Songs written by Shelly Peiken